Croatia competed at the 2012 Summer Olympics in London, United Kingdom, from 27 July to 12 August 2012. This was the nation's sixth consecutive appearance at the Summer Olympics.

The Croatian Olympic Committee (HOO) sent the nation's largest delegation to the Games. A total of 108 athletes, 64 men and 44 women, competed in 17 sports. Women's basketball, men's water polo, and handball were the only team-based sports in which Croatia had its representation in these Olympic Games. Among the sports played by athletes, Croatia also marked its Olympic debut in judo and fencing.

Croatian athletes featured two sets of twins (taekwondo jins Lucija and Ana Zaninović, and Greco-Roman wrestlers Neven and Nenad Žugaj). Table tennis player and Olympic silver medalist Zoran Primorac became the first Croatian athlete to participate in seven Olympic Games as an individual athlete (his first appearance competed under the former Socialist Federal Republic of Yugoslavia), and was also the oldest athlete of the team, at age 43. Venio Losert, captain of the men's handball team, was appointed by the committee to carry the nation's flag at the opening ceremony.

Croatia left London with a total of 6 Olympic medals (3 gold, 1 silver, and 2 bronze). This was the nation's most successful Olympics, based on the most medals won at a single games. All gold medals, being the highest in the nation's Olympic history, were awarded for the first time in women's discus throw, men's trap shooting, and men's water polo.

Medalists

Athletics 

Croatian athletes have achieved qualifying standards in the following athletics events (up to a maximum of 3 athletes in each event at the 'A' Standard, and 1 at the 'B' Standard): Former high jump world champion Blanka Vlašić did not compete in the London Olympics due to injury problems, although she was qualified for the Games.

Key
 Note – Ranks given for track events are within the athlete's heat only
 Q = Qualified for the next round
 q = Qualified for the next round as a fastest loser or, in field events, by position without achieving the qualifying target
 NR = National record
 N/A = Round not applicable for the event
 Bye = Athlete not required to compete in round

Men
Field events

Women
Track & road events

Field events

Basketball

Croatia has qualified a women's team.

 Women's team event – 1 team of 12 players

Women's tournament

Roster

Group play

Canoeing

Slalom

Cycling

Road

 Robert Kišerlovski was initially selected for road race, but he had to withdraw after he got injured on the 14th stage of Tour de France. As a consequence, Kristijan Đurasek was selected as a replacement. Đurasek's participation was later confirmed by IOC.

Fencing

Croatia has qualified 1 fencer.

Men

Gymnastics

Artistic
Men

Women

Handball

Summary

Men's tournament

Roster

Group play

Quarter-final

Semifinal

Bronze medal match

Women's tournament

Roster

Group play

Quarter-final

Judo

Rowing

Men

Qualification Legend: FA=Final A (medal); FB=Final B (non-medal); FC=Final C (non-medal); FD=Final D (non-medal); FE=Final E (non-medal); FF=Final F (non-medal); SA/B=Semifinals A/B; SC/D=Semifinals C/D; SE/F=Semifinals E/F; QF=Quarterfinals; R=Repechage

Sailing

Croatia has qualified 1 boat for each of the following events.

Men

Women

M = Medal race; EL = Eliminated – did not advance into the medal race;

Shooting

Thanks to the wins at the 2011 ISSF World Cup competitions, 2011 European Shooting Championships and 2012 European Championships for 10 m events, Croatia has earned five quota places in shooting events.

Men

Women

Swimming 

Croatian swimmers have achieved qualifying standards in the following events (up to a maximum of 2 swimmers in each event at the Olympic Qualifying Time (OQT), and 1 at the Olympic Selection Time (OST)):

Men

Women

Table tennis

Croatia has qualified four athletes for singles table tennis events. Based on his ITTF world rankings as of 16 May 2011 Zoran Primorac has qualified for the men's event.

Taekwondo 

Croatia has ensured berths in the following events of taekwondo by reaching the top 3 of the 2011 World Taekwondo Olympic Qualification Tournament in Baku, Azerbaijan:

Tennis

Water polo 

The Croatia men's national water polo team (13 athletes) qualified for the Olympic Games by reaching the semi-finals at the 2011 World Aquatics Championships in Shanghai, People's Republic of China.

Summary

Men's tournament

Roster

Group play

Quarter-final

Semifinal

Gold medal match

Wrestling 

Key
  - Victory by Fall.
  - Decision by Points - the loser with technical points.
  - Decision by Points - the loser without technical points.

Men's Greco-Roman

References

Nations at the 2012 Summer Olympics
2012
Summer Olympics